Rhytidospora is a genus of fungi within the family Ceratostomataceae.

References

External links

Sordariomycetes genera
Melanosporales